Flacq is a district of Mauritius, situated in the east of the island. It is the largest district, having an area of 297.9 km², the population estimate was at 138,460 as at 31 December 2015.

Places of interest

The small village of Trou d'Eau Douce, from where visitors take boats for tours on Île aux Cerfs island. The beach Belle Mare attracts a lot of Mauritians and tourists.

Places
The Flacq District include different regions; however, some regions are further divided into different suburbs. Note that the statistics do not take into account the two new village councils areas were created out of Écroignard and Grande Retraite out of Laventure in 2011 following the new Local Government Act.

Places by population

See also
 Districts of Mauritius
 List of places in Mauritius

References 

 
Districts of Mauritius